Kiwanuka may refer to:
 Prince Wasajja Kiwanuka (born 1980), a royal Prince from Buganda Kingdom, Uganda
 Benedicto Kiwanuka (1922–1972), first Prime Minister of Uganda
 Mathias Kiwanuka (born 1983), player in the NFL, grandson of Benedicto Kiwanuka
 Michael Kiwanuka (born 1987), British soul musician
 Nam Kiwanuka, Canadian television host and journalist
 Maria Kiwanuka, Ugandan economist, businesswoman and politician, Minister of Finance in Uganda's Cabinet (2011–present)
 Kiwanuka (album), a 2019 album by Michael Kiwanuka

 Kiwanuka, Baganda thunder and lightning god